The Evangelical church in Dúbravka, a suburb of Bratislava, is the second-youngest religious building in this part of Bratislava. Originally built as a ceremonial hall in the 1980s, regular evangelical worship services began in 1995. In 2003, the building became the property of the Slovak Evangelical Church. The church consists of a main hall with a capacity of about 200 people and a minor hall with a 100-person capacity. In 2006, the general bishop consecrated a white marble octangular baptismal font made as a commemoration to the early Christian believers and traditions. The interior is dominated by 4-meter-tall wooden cross with textile depiction of the Creed.

The church is the center of evangelical believers of Bratislava's fourth district.

References

External links 
 Evangelical parish Bratislava - Dúbravka 

Churches in Bratislava
20th-century churches in Slovakia